Ritner Creek is a tributary of the Luckiamute River in Polk County in the U.S. state of Oregon. The creek begins near Bald Mountain in the Central Oregon Coast Range and flows generally southeast to meet the Luckiamute southwest of Pedee and north of Kings Valley. Named tributaries of Ritner Creek from source to mouth are Sheythe, Love, Clayton, and Kinsey creeks.

Ritner Creek passes under Oregon Route 223 just before entering the river. The Ritner Creek Bridge, a  covered bridge, carried the highway over the creek until 1976. Replaced by a concrete span, it was the last covered bridge on an Oregon state highway.

Name
The creek was named for Sebastian Ritner, who emigrated to Oregon in 1845. His donation land claim included part of the creek. A railroad station named Ritner was part of the Valley and Siletz Railroad.

Parks
The covered bridge was saved and moved to an adjacent site that doubles as a small county park, the Minnie Ritner Ruiter Wayside. The park, open all year during daylight hours, has picnic tables and a portable restroom.

Further upstream along Gage Road and Ritner Creek is Ritner Creek Park, another county recreation site. Amenities include fire pits, picnic tables, walking trails, and a restroom. This park is also open all year between sunrise and a half-hour after sunset.

See also
List of rivers of Oregon

References

External links
Luckiamute Watershed Council

Rivers of Polk County, Oregon
Rivers of Oregon